Mary Morez (January 16, 1946 – September 25, 2004) was a Navajo painter.

Born near Tuba City, Arizona, Morez was stricken with both polio and rheumatic fever as a girl, and underwent numerous operations as a result before being adopted by Lawrence and Mary Keim. She first studied at the Phoenix Indian School before receiving a bachelor's degree from the University of Arizona and received a scholarship to study fashion illustration at the Ray Vogue Art School in Chicago. In 1969 she chose to devote her work to full-time painting instead of commercial art. Allan Houser and Oscar Howe served as her mentors early in life. Her work combined traditional Navajo elements with a more contemporary, abstract style. Besides painting Morez also worked as a textile artist. For much of her career she lived in Phoenix, Arizona. Morez is represented in the collection of the Wheelwright Museum of the American Indian.

References

1946 births
2004 deaths
Navajo painters
Native American textile artists
American women painters
American textile artists
20th-century American painters
20th-century American women artists
21st-century American painters
21st-century American women artists
People from Coconino County, Arizona
Artists from Phoenix, Arizona
Painters from Arizona
University of Arizona alumni
Native American women artists
Women textile artists
20th-century indigenous painters of the Americas
21st-century indigenous painters of the Americas
20th-century Native Americans
21st-century Native Americans
20th-century Native American women
21st-century Native American women